Famous Places is the third album of American ambient musician Keith Kenniff under the Goldmund moniker. Famous Places features piano compositions named after locations that have played an important part in Kenniff's life to date. A close-miced recording technique accentuates the simplicity and intimacy of Kenniff's melodious musings, and while the piano solo is clearly the medium the Goldmund project is predominantly concerned with, Kenniff frequently adds contextual details to his recordings, setting his keywork among billowy, abstract drones, a few quietly mixed-in additional instruments and occasional percussion (such as 'Dane Street').

Track listing

References

External links
 Famous Places at Goldmund Shop
 Famous Places at Discogs
 Famous Places review

2010 albums
Keith Kenniff albums
Western Vinyl albums